Dalmatian city-states were the Dalmatian localities where the local Romance population survived the Barbarian invasions after the fall of the Western Roman Empire in the 400s CE. Eight little cities were created by those autochthonous inhabitants that maintained political links with the Eastern Roman Empire (which defended these cities, enabling their commerce). The original names of these cities were Jadera, Spalatum, Crespa, Arba, Tragurium, Vecla, Ragusium, and Cattarum. The language and the laws were initially Latin, but after a few centuries, they developed their own Neo-Latin language, Dalmatico, which lasted until the 19th century. The cities were maritime centres with huge commerce, mainly with the Italian peninsula and with the growing Republic of Venice.

History
After the fall of the Roman Empire, Dalmatia consisted of a group of autochthonous coastal cities functioning much like city-states, with extensive autonomy, but without control of the rural hinterland controlled by the Slavic tribes who arrived after 640 AD.

Ethnically, Dalmatia started out as a Roman region, with a romance culture that began to develop independently, forming the now-extinct Dalmatian language called Dalmatico. These cities were characterized by common Latin laws, Catholic religion, language, commerce, and political and administrative structures.

The eight city-states were:
 Jadera (now called in) – Originally a small island in the central Dalmatia coast
 Spalatum – Initially created inside the Diocletian Palace
 Crespa – On an island in northern Dalmatia
 Arba, – On a small island in front of the northern Velebit mountains
 Tragurium – On a small island not far away from Roman Salona
 Vecla – On an island near the northern Dalmatia coast
 Ragusium – Originally a promontory in southern Dalmatia
 Cattarum – Inside the Bay of Kotor, today in Montenegro

Later were added other cities in north-central Dalmatia, like Sebenicum (now Šibenik), Flumen (now Rijeka), and Pagus (now Pag).

Indeed, in the Early Medieval period, Byzantine Dalmatia was ravaged by an Avar invasion that destroyed its capital, Salona, in 639 AD. This event allowed for the settlement of the nearby Diocletian's Palace in Spalatum by Salonitans, greatly increasing the importance of the city. The Avars were followed by the great South Slavic migrations.

The Slavs, loosely allied with the Avars, permanently settled the region in the first half of the 7th century AD and remained its predominant ethnic group ever since. The Croats soon formed their own realm: the Principality of Dalmatian Croatia, ruled by native Princes of Guduscan origin. The meaning of the geographical term "Dalmatia" now shrunk to the cities and their immediate hinterland. These cities and towns remained influential as they were well-fortified and maintained their connection with the Byzantine Empire. The two communities were somewhat hostile at first, but as the Croats became Christianized, this tension gradually subsided. A degree of cultural mingling soon took place, in some enclaves stronger, in others weaker, as Slavic influence and culture were more accentuated in Ragusium and Cattarum while the influence from the Italian peninsula was stronger in the northern Dalmatia islands and in Jadera and Spalatum.

Around 950 AD, as the Dalmatian city-states gradually lost all protection by Byzantium, being unable to unite in a defensive league hindered by their internal dissensions, they had to turn to Venice for support. Each of the Dalmatian city-states needed protection (even from piracy), based mostly on economic reasons. In the year 1000 AD, an expedition of Venetian ships in coastal Istria and Dalmatia secured the Venetian suzerainty in the area, and the Narentines (Slav) pirates were suppressed permanently. On the occasion, Doge Orseolo named himself "Duke of Dalmatia", starting the colonial Empire of Venice.

The Venetians, to whom the Dalmatians were already bound by language and culture, could afford to concede liberal terms as its main goal was to prevent the development of any dangerous political or commercial competitor on the eastern Adriatic. The seafaring community in Dalmatia looked to Venice as the new "queen" of the Adriatic Sea. In return for protection, these eight Neo-Latin cities often furnished a contingent to the army or navy of their suzerain, and sometimes paid tribute either in money or in kind. Arbe (now Rab), for example, annually paid ten pounds of silk or five pounds of gold to Venice. The Dalmatian cities might elect their own chief magistrate, bishop, and judges; their Roman law remained valid, and they were even permitted to conclude separate alliances.

In these centuries, the Dalmatian language started to disappear, assimilated by the Venetian dialect. Dalmatian was spoken on the Dalmatian coast from Fiume (now Rijeka) as far south as Cottorum (Kotor) in Montenegro. Speakers lived mainly in the coastal towns of Jadera (Zadar), Tragurium (Trogir), Spalatum (Split), Ragusium (Dubrovnik), and also on the islands of Curicta (Krk), Crepsa (Cres), and Arba (Rab). Almost every city developed its own dialect, but the most important dialects now known were Vegliot, a northern dialect spoken on the island of Curicta, and Ragusan, a southern dialect spoken in and around Ragusa (Dubrovnik).

The cities of Jadera, Spalatum, Tragurium, and Ragusium and the surrounding territories each changed hands several times between Venice, Hungary, and Byzantium during the 12th century. In 1202, the armies of the Fourth Crusade rendered assistance to Venice by occupying Jadera, which started to be officially called Zara. In 1204, the same army conquered Byzantium and finally eliminated the Eastern Empire from the list of contenders on the Dalmatian territory.

The late 13th century was marked by a decline in external hostilities. The Dalmatian cities started accepting complete foreign sovereignty, mainly that of the Republic of Venice. The only exception was Ragusium, which remained independent creating the Republic of Ragusa, which later ended in 1808 after the Napoleon conquest.

From 1420 started the Venetian domination of the other seven of the original Dalmatian city-states, which were fully integrated with the Venetian (and Italian) society of the Italian Renaissance. Zara become the capital of Venetian Dalmatia—as part of the Stato da Mar—until the end of the Republic of Venice (1797). In the next centuries, the city was the main center of the Dalmatian Italians.

The last speaker of any Dalmatian dialect of the Dalmatian city-states was Tuone Udaina, who was accidentally killed in an explosion on June 10, 1898, on the island of Veglia (now Krk). With him disappeared the last vestige of the Dalmatian Neo-Latin cities. His language was studied by the scholar Matteo Bartoli, himself a native of nearby Istria, who visited Udaina in 1897 and wrote down approximately 2,800 words, stories, and accounts of his life. These were published in a book which has since provided much information on the vocabulary, phonology, and grammar of the language. Bartoli wrote in Italian and published a translation in German (Das Dalmatische) in 1906; this book is considered the first on ethnic minority disappearance in world literature.

Dalmatian Pale
The boundaries of the eight original Dalmatian city-states were defined by the so-called Dalmatian Pale, the boundary of Roman local laws. This name is a reference to The Pale that existed in Ireland under British control. The word pale derives ultimately from the Latin word , meaning stake, specifically a stake used to support a fence. From this came the figurative meaning of boundary and eventually the phrase beyond the pale, as something outside the boundary. The term was used not only for the "Pale" in Ireland and in Dalmatia, but also for various other English colonial settlements, notably Pale of Calais, and later for the Jewish Pale in Russia.

Historian Johannes Lucius included Fiume (now Rijeka) and Sebenico (now Šibenik) after the year 1000, when Venice started to take control of the region, in the Dalmatian Pale.

Indeed, Fiume was the former Roman Tarsatica: a small, fortified city under the Italian Aquileia (and Pola) bishops, enclosed within the town walls which had several defense towers. The town, called Flumen, was granted autonomy in the 11th century by the bishop and was divided into two parts: in the upper part was the medieval Trsat Castle (formerly a Roman fort) and the church of St. Vitus (thus the name 'Flumen Sancti Viti'), while in the lower part (the popular) there was a commercial and trading center where many Italian merchants settled around the year 1000.

Sebenico was the ancient Roman city of Burnum, destroyed by the Avars and rebuilt in the 9th century by the Croats. In 1298, Pope Boniface VIII signed a "bolla" that declared a bishop for the town, that so was to be a "free city" from the local Ban Paul I Šubić of Bribir.

Furthermore, about Sebenico, Thomas Jackson wrote that:

Lucius wrote even that Pagus (the Venetian Pago, now called Pag) had municipal autonomy and was virtually independent for centuries around the year 1000. In 1244, the Hungarian King Béla IV named it a "free royal city" and in 1376, Louis I of Hungary granted it autonomy. In 1409, Pago, together with the whole island, passed permanently to the Republic of Venice and reconfirmed their communal autonomy guaranteed by a board of 50 civic local aristocratic families (this board was created in 1451).

See also
History of Dalmatia
Venetian Dalmatia
Dalmatian Italians
Dalmatia (theme)
Stato da Mar

References

Bibliography
 Cattalinich, Giovanni. Storia della Dalmazia (Books 1-2; editore Battara, 1834). Oxford University. Oxford, 2007
 Florin, Curta. Southeastern Europe in the Middle Ages, 500-1250. Cambridge University Press. Cambridge, 2006. 
 *
 Jackson, Thomas. Dalmatia, the Quarnero and Istria with Cettigne in Montenegro and the Island of Grado. Clarendon Press. Oxford, 1887

History of Dalmatia
City-states
Byzantine Dalmatia